Parameshwar Hivrale (born 28 June 1991) is an Indian actor and director who works in Telugu cinema. He made his debut with the 2015 film Chiru Godavalu .

Personal life

Family 
Parameshwar Hivrale was born in Kamareddy, Telangana, India, in a Hinduism family. From a young age,

Film life 
He acted in films like Chiru Godavalu (2015) made by Annapurna College of Film and Media Students, Kumari 18+ (2016), Lavanya with Love Boys (2017), Jathiya rahadari (2021), and Daari (2022). He is now turning director. His behind-the-screen debut is for a pan-India film titled Gummadi Narsaiah, an eponymous biopic on the life of the tribal leader Gummadi Narsaiah, a five-time MLA from Yellandu, Bhadradri-Kothagudem district.

Filmography

Telugu

Awards and nominations 

He was nominated as best actor for Jathiya Rahadari in the year of 2021 .

References

External links 

Living people
Male actors in Telugu cinema
Male actors in Tamil cinema
Indian male film actors
21st-century Indian male actors
Telugu screenwriters
Telugu male actors
Male actors from Hyderabad, India
Screenwriters from Hyderabad, India
1991 births